Thomas P. Wheelock (1813–1864) was an American inventor and gunsmith. Along with his brother-in-law Ethan Allen, he produced several single-action revolvers and rifles in the United States during the mid-19th century.

References

Bibliography 
 Thomas, H.H. (1965). The Story of Allen & Wheelock Firearms .

Gunsmiths
19th-century American inventors
1813 births
1864 deaths